Haberlandia togoensis is a moth in the family Cossidae. It is found in central Togo.

The wingspan is about 18 mm. The forewings are warm buff with ecru-olive lines towards
the dorsum. The hindwings are colonial buff with a reticulated buffy olive pattern.

Etymology
The species is named for the country Togo, the type locality.

References

Natural History Museum Lepidoptera generic names catalog

Moths described in 2011
Metarbelinae
Taxa named by Ingo Lehmann